Charlie's Death Wish is a 2005 action thriller film directed by Jeff Leroy and starring Ron Jeremy and Phoebe Dollar.

Cast

 Phoebe Dollar as Charlie
 Ron Jeremy as Captain Al Rosenberg
 Lemmy as himself
 Dizzy Reed as Mumbles
 Tracii Guns as Roscoe
 John Clark as Dr. Pheifer
 Jennifer Burton as Desk Cop
 Randal Malone as Harry Niche

References

External links

2005 films
2005 action thriller films
American action comedy films
2000s English-language films
2000s American films